Sang-e Karmu Shirzadi (also Romanized as Sāng-e Karmū Shīrzādī) is a village in Cheleh Rural District, in the Central District of Gilan-e Gharb County, Kermanshah Province, Iran. At the 2006 census, its population was 276, in 59 families.

References 

Populated places in Gilan-e Gharb County